Makhnev or Makhnyov is a Russian masculine surname, its feminine counterpart is Makhneva or Makhnyova. It may refer to
Elena Makhnev, Mexican violinist
Gennady Makhnev (born 1951), Soviet sprint canoer 
Vadzim Makhneu (born 1979), Belarusian flatwater canoer 

Russian-language surnames